Paola Capriolo (born 1 January 1962) is an Italian novelist and translator.

The daughter of a theatre critic and translator from Liguria and an artist from Turin, she was born in Milan and was educated at the University of Milan, receiving a degree in philosophy in 1996. In 1988, she published her first book La grande Eulalia, a collection of short stories which won the Giuseppe Berto Prize.

Her work explores a reality outside of day-to-day life. Myth plays an important role in her writing. She often is inspired by music, including references to music and making use of musical metaphors.

Capriolo is also a reviewer for Corriere della Sera and a translator of German fiction. Her work has been translated into several languages including English, French, Spanish, German, Danish, Dutch and  Japanese.

Selected works

Novels/short stories 
 Il nocchiero (1989), received the Rapallo Carige Prize in 1990 and was a finalist for the Premio Campiello in 1991
 Il doppio regno (1991) was a finalist for the Grinzane Cavour Prize in 1992
 Vissi d’amore (1992)
 La spettatrice (1995)
 Un uomo di carattere (1996)
 Barbara (1998)
 Una di loro (2001)
 Qualcosa nella notte. Storia di Gilgamesh, signore di Uruk, e dell'uomo selvatico cresciuto tra le gazzelle (2003)
 ll pianista muto (2009)
 Caino (2012)
 Mi ricordo (2015)

Children's literature 
 La ragazza dalla stella d'oro (1991)
 L’amico invisibile (2006)
 Maria Callas (2007)
 Indira Gandhi (2009)
 La macchina dei sogni (2009)

Translations from German 
 La morte a Venice Thomas Mann (1991)
 I dolori del giovane Werther Johann Wolfgang von Goethe (1993)
 Le affinità elettive Johann Wolfgang von Goethe (1995)
 Doppio sogno Arthur Schnitzler (2002)
 Pietre colorate Adalbert Stifter (2005)
 Metamorfosi Franz Kafka (2011)

References 

1962 births
Living people
Italian children's writers
Italian women novelists
Italian women short story writers
German translators
Italian women children's writers